Andrew Macdonald Baker (born 8 October 2002) is an English professional footballer who plays for Irish club Bohemians on loan from Fleetwood Town, as a centre-back.

Career
Baker was born in Cheshire but attended Manchester Grammar School. Whilst at the school, he was called up in November 2019 to the England Independent Schools Under-18 age group matches against Wales Colleges and England Colleges. He started his youth career in the Academy at Manchester City where he played for ten years from the under-4 to under-14 level, winning the Premier League Championship three times. He subsequently spent two years in the youth team at Crewe Alexandra before signing a two-year scholarship at EFL League Two side Oldham Athletic. In May 2021, it was announced that he would not be offered a professional contract at Oldham and that he would be released at the end of his scholarship.

He dropped down to Non-League when he signed for Northern Premier League Premier Division side FC United of Manchester for the 2021–22 campaign, following a trial during pre-season. As the club only trained part-time, he also worked as an IT Consultant. He was an ever-present in the backline going onto make twenty-seven appearances in all competitions, scoring one goal in a 3–1 win over Witton Albion.

On 4 January 2022, he signed for EFL League One side Fleetwood Town on a deal until the summer of 2023, with the club holding an option for another one-year extension. Upon signing, he was immediately placed into the Development Squad. On 23 August 2022, he made his professional debut at the age of 19, when he started in the 1–0 EFL Cup second round defeat at home to Premier League side Everton. On 3rd September he made his League One Debut against Wycombe Wanders in a 1-1 draw.

On 16 February 2023, Baker signed for League of Ireland Premier Division club Bohemians on loan until the end of June.

Career statistics

References

2002 births
Living people
Sportspeople from Chester
F.C. United of Manchester players
Fleetwood Town F.C. players
Bohemian F.C. players
Northern Premier League players
English Football League players
League of Ireland players
Expatriate association footballers in the Republic of Ireland
Association football defenders
English footballers